Full Clip is a 2004 action film starring Busta Rhymes, Xzibit, Bubba Smith, Tiny Lister and Mark Boone Junior. It is directed by mink and written by Kantz. Full Clip is a 1970s-style blaxploitation action movie that is a loose remake of the 1975 film Bucktown.

Plot
Joshua Pope (Busta Rhymes) returns to his home in a small town to claim the inheritance his father has left him. Once there, however, he finds that the local police have corrupted the town and are ruling with an iron fist. So, with the help of an old friend (Xzibit) and his cohorts, Pope sets out to reclaim the town he once loved.

Cast
 Xzibit as Duncan
 Shaun Baker as McCloud
 Busta Rhymes as Joshua Pope
 Bubba Smith as Sleepy
 Julio Lugo as Milkman
 Shakara Ledard as Simone
 Mark Boone Junior as Sheriff Wallace 
 Prodigy as Gideon
 Tiny Lister Jr. as Boomiyay
 Bobb'e J. Thompson as Stokley
 Nichole Hiltz as Shelly
 Ellen Cleghorne as Ma Dukes
 DeRay Davis as Preacher

References

External links

2004 action films
2004 films
Remakes of American films
Hood films
American action films
2000s English-language films
2000s American films